The Fiji national under-17 football team is the national U-17 team of Fiji and is controlled by the Fiji Football Association.

Competition Record

FIFA U-17 World Cup record

OFC U-17 Championship record
The OFC U-17 Championship is a tournament held once every two years to decide the only two qualification spots for the Oceania Football Confederation (OFC) and its representatives at the FIFA U-17 World Cup.

Current Technical Staff

Current squad
 The following players were called up for the 2023 OFC U-17 Championship matches.
 Match dates: 11 – 28 January 2023
 Opposition:'  and 

2017 Squad
The following players were called up for the 2017 OFC U-17 Championship from 11 to 24 February 2017.Caps and goals as of 18 February 2017 after the game against New Zealand.''

Fixtures & Results

2018

List of coaches
  Hussain Sahib (2010-2011)
  Kamal Swamy (2012-2015)
  Yogendra Dutt (2014-2015)
  Shalen Lal (2016-)

Notes

References

External links
Fiji Football Association official website

Oceanian national under-17 association football teams
under-17